This is a list of 94 species in Thrypticus, a genus of long-legged flies in the family Dolichopodidae.

Thrypticus species

 Thrypticus abditus Becker, 1922 c g
 Thrypticus abdominalis (Say, 1829) i c g
 Thrypticus acuticauda Van Duzee, 1929 c g
 Thrypticus adauctus Parent, 1933 c g
 Thrypticus aequalis Robinson, 1975 c g
 Thrypticus afer Vanschuytbroeck, 1951 c g
 Thrypticus altaicus Negrobov in Negrobov & Stackelberg, 1971 c g
 Thrypticus amoenus Becker, 1922 c g
 Thrypticus analis Becker, 1922 c g
 Thrypticus aphroditus Negrobov & Tsurikov, 1986 c g
 Thrypticus arahakiensis Bickel, 1992 c g
 Thrypticus armatus Robinson, 1975 c g
 Thrypticus atomus Frey, 1915 c g
 Thrypticus aurinotatus Van Duzee, 1915 i c g
 Thrypticus australis Bickel, 1986 c g
 Thrypticus azuricola Bickel & Hernandez, 2004 c g
 Thrypticus basalis Van Duzee, 1930 c g
 Thrypticus bellus Loew, 1869 c g
 Thrypticus brevicauda Van Duzee, 1930 c g
 Thrypticus caeruleus Naglis & Negrobov, 2020
 Thrypticus caudatus Parent, 1939 c g
 Thrypticus chanophallus Bickel & Hernandez, 2004 c g
 Thrypticus circularis Bickel & Hernandez, 2004 c g
 Thrypticus comosus Van Duzee, 1915 i c g
 Thrypticus crinipes Robinson, 1975 c g
 Thrypticus cuneatus (Becker, 1917) c g
 Thrypticus deficiens Robinson, 1980 i c g
 Thrypticus delicatus Robinson, 1975 c g
 Thrypticus dissectus Robinson, 1964 i c g
 Thrypticus divisus (Strobl, 1880) c g
 Thrypticus edwardsi Van Duzee, 1931 c g
 Thrypticus emiliae Negrobov in Negrobov & Stackelberg, 1971 c g
 Thrypticus flavicornis Van Duzee, 1933 c g
 Thrypticus formosensis Bickel & Hernandez, 2004 c g
 Thrypticus fortescuensis Bickel, 1986 c g
 Thrypticus fosteri Robinson, 1980 i c g
 Thrypticus fraterculus (Wheeler, 1890) i c g
 †Thrypticus gestuosus Meunier, 1907
 Thrypticus grogani Robinson, 1980 i c g
 †Thrypticus gulosus Meunier, 1907
 Thrypticus incanus Negrobov, 1967 c g
 Thrypticus intercedens Negrobov, 1967 c g
 Thrypticus kataevi Grichanov, 1998 c g
 Thrypticus kechevi Naglis & Negrobov, 2020
 Thrypticus laetus Verrall, 1912 c g
 Thrypticus longicauda Van Duzee, 1921 i c g
 Thrypticus mediofuscus Runyon, 2020
 Thrypticus minor Aldrich, 1896 c g
 Thrypticus minutus Parent, 1929 i c
 Thrypticus mironovi Grichanov, 1998 c g
 Thrypticus mongoliensis Negrobov, Selivanova & Maslova, 2019
 Thrypticus muhlenbergiae Johannsen & Crosby, 1913 i c g
 Thrypticus nigricauda Wood, 1913 c g
 Thrypticus nigripes Van Duzee, 1921 i c g
 Thrypticus nigriseta Van Duzee, 1931 c g
 Thrypticus pallidicoxa Parent, 1928 c g
 Thrypticus paludicola Negrobov in Negrobov & Stackelberg, 1971 c g
 Thrypticus parabellus Grichanov, 2000 c g
 Thrypticus parvulus Van Duzee, 1930 c g
 Thrypticus penicillatus Van Duzee, 1931 c g
 Thrypticus politus Negrobov, 1967 c g
 Thrypticus pollinosus Verrall, 1912 c g
 Thrypticus pruinosus Parent, 1932 c g
 Thrypticus pusillus Aldrich, 1901 c g
 Thrypticus riparius Negrobov in Negrobov & Stackelberg, 1971 c g
 Thrypticus romus Bickel & Hernandez, 2004 c g
 Thrypticus sagittatus Bickel & Hernandez, 2004 c g
 Thrypticus schmidti Parent, 1928 c g
 Thrypticus scutellatus Van Duzee, 1931 c g
 Thrypticus senilis Robinson, 1975 c g
 Thrypticus sinevi Grichanov, 1998 c g
 Thrypticus singularis Aldrich, 1896 c g
 Thrypticus smaragdinus Gerstäcker, 1864 g
 †Thrypticus sobrius Meunier, 1907
 Thrypticus spretus Parent, 1934 c g
 Thrypticus squamiciliatus Harmston & Rapp, 1968 i c g
 Thrypticus subdissectus Robinson, 1975 c g
 Thrypticus subtilis Negrobov in Negrobov & Stackelberg, 1971
 Thrypticus sumatranus Hollis, 1964 c g
 Thrypticus taragui Bickel & Hernandez, 2004 c g
 Thrypticus tarsalis Parent, 1932 c g
 Thrypticus tectus Van Duzee, 1915 i c g
 Thrypticus tropicus Bickel, 1986 c g
 Thrypticus truncatus Bickel & Hernandez, 2004 c g
 Thrypticus tsacasi Negrobov in Negrobov & Stackelberg, 1971 c g
 Thrypticus varipes Robinson, 1975 c g
 Thrypticus vestitus Negrobov in Negrobov & Stackelberg, 1971 c g
 Thrypticus vietus Van Duzee, 1915 i c g
 Thrypticus violaceus Van Duzee, 1927 i c g b
 Thrypticus virescens Negrobov, 1967 c g
 Thrypticus viridis Parent, 1932 c g
 Thrypticus willistoni (Wheeler, 1890) i c g b
 Thrypticus yanayacu Bickel & Hernandez, 2004 c g
 Thrypticus zagulyaevi Grichanov, 1998 c g

Unrecognised species:
 Thrypticus aeneus (Meigen, 1838) c g
 Thrypticus alpinus (Meigen, 1824) c g
 Thrypticus bicolor (Macquart, 1827) c g
 Thrypticus coeruleocephalus (Meigen, 1824) c
 Thrypticus cupreus (Macquart, 1838) c g
 Thrypticus cylindricum (Zetterstedt, 1838) c g
 Thrypticus decoratus (Haliday, 1832) c g
 Thrypticus exiguus (Zetterstedt, 1843) c g
 Thrypticus festiva (Meigen, 1838) c g
 Thrypticus fasciatus (Macquart, 1834) c g
 Thrypticus fulgidus (Fallen, 1823) c g
 Thrypticus inconspicuus (Zetterstedt, 1843) c g
 Thrypticus longicollis (Meigen, 1824) c g
 Thrypticus maculipes (Meigen, 1824) c g
 Thrypticus magnicornis (Zetterstedt, 1843) c g
 Thrypticus minuta (Fabricius, 1805) c g
 Thrypticus misellus (Boheman, 1852) c g
 Thrypticus obscuratus (Meigen, 1824) c g
 Thrypticus parvus (Macquart, 1834) c g
 Thrypticus rufipes (Meigen, 1838) c g
 Thrypticus sublamellatus (Macquart, 1827) c g
 Thrypticus suturalis (Meigen, 1830) c g
 Thrypticus thoracicus (Meigen, 1824) c g

Synonyms:
 Thrypticus cupulifer Aldrich, 1896: c g Synonym of Thrypticus abdominalis (Say, 1829)
 Thrypticus fennicus Becker, 1917: c g Synonym of Thrypticus divisus (Strobl, 1880)
 Thrypticus insulanus Van Duzee, 1933: c g Synonym of Thrypticus minutus Parent, 1929
 Thrypticus tonsus Negrobov in Negrobov & Stackelberg, 1972: c g synonym of Thrypticus subtilis Negrobov in Negrobov & Stackelberg, 1971

The following are listed for the genus by online databases, but are actually placed in other genera:
 Thrypticus dissimilipes (Zetterstedt, 1843): c g Actually in Dolichopus, synonym of Dolichopus lepidus Staeger, 1842
 Thrypticus flavicoxa (Meigen, 1824): c g Actually in Anepsiomyia, synonym of Anepsiomyia flaviventris (Meigen, 1824)
 Thrypticus flaviventris (Macquart, 1827): c g Actually in Argyra, synonym of Argyra ilonae Gosseries, 1989
 Thrypticus fulgens (von Roser, 1840): c Actually in Sciapus, synonym of Sciapus laetus (Meigen, 1838)
 Thrypticus fulviventris (Macquart, 1827): c g Actually in Argyra, synonym of Argyra leucocephala (Meigen, 1824)
 Thrypticus pygmaeus (Macquart, 1828): c g Actually in Sympycnus, synonym of Sympycnus pulicarius (Fallen, 1823)
 Thrypticus ruficauda (Zetterstedt, 1859): c g Actually in Hercostomus
 Thrypticus taeniomerus (Zetterstedt, 1843): c g Actually in Chrysotus, possible synonym of Chrysotus pulchellus Kowarz, 1874
 Thrypticus thalassinus (Haliday, 1832): c g Actually in Dolichopus, possible synonym of Dolichopus simplex Meigen, 1824
 Thrypticus tibialis (von Roser, 1840): c g Actually in Rhaphium
 Thrypticus vividus (Meigen, 1824): c Actually in Argyra, possible synonym of Argyra argyria (Meigen, 1824)
 Thrypticus zonatulus (Zetterstedt, 1843): c g Actually in Sciapus

Data sources: i = ITIS, c = Catalogue of Life, g = GBIF, b = Bugguide.net

References

Thrypticus